Donald Lewes Hings,  (November 6, 1907 – February 25, 2004) was a Canadian inventor, born in Leicester, England. In 1937 he created a portable radio signaling system for his employer CM&S, which he called a "packset", but which later became known as the "Walkie-Talkie".

While Hings was filing a U.S. patent for the packset in Spokane, Washington in 1939, Canada declared war on Germany.  CM&S sent Hings to Ottawa to redevelop his new invention for military use, and he worked there from 1940 to 1945.  During these years, he developed a number of models, including the successful C-58 Walkie-Talkie which eventually sold eighteen thousand units produced for infantry use, and for which he received the MBE in 1946 and the Order Of Canada in 2001.

Following the war, he moved to Burnaby, British Columbia, where he established an electronics R&D company, Electronic Labs of Canada.  He continued researching and creating in the fields of communications and geophysics until his retirement.  He held more than 55 patents in Canada and the United States, and was the inventor of the klystron magnetometer survey system.  In 2006, Hings was inducted into the Telecommunications Hall of Fame.

Born in Leicester, England, he moved to Canada with his mother when he was three. He died on Capitol Hill, Burnaby, in 2004.

References

External links
Hings' Website includes many original documents and images.

1907 births
2004 deaths
20th-century Canadian inventors
Members of the Order of Canada
Canadian Members of the Order of the British Empire
British emigrants to Canada
People from Leicester